Peter Post (12 November 193314 January 2011) was a Dutch professional cyclist whose career lasted from 1956 to 1972. Post competed in road and track racing. As a rider he is best remembered for Six-day racing, having competed in 155 races and won 65. Because of this success he was known as “De Keizer van de Zesdaagse” or “The Emperor of the Six Days”. In road racing his main achievements were winning the 1964 Paris–Roubaix and becoming national road race champion in 1963. He was on the podium three times at the La Flèche Wallonne but never won. Post’s other nickname was “de Lange” or “Big Man” because he was tall for a cyclist. After retiring from racing he had success as a Directeur sportif. Peter Post died in Amstelveen on 14 January 2011.

Road career 
Post turned professional in 1956 with the small Dutch team R.I.H. He rode for the first few years with Gerrit Schulte, a track rider who also rode on the road and was an inspiration to him. Notable early career successes on the road came when he won the Ronde van Nederland in 1960 and the 1962 Deutschland Tour. In 1963 he became national road race champion as well as winning the Tour of Belgium.

In 1964 Post had his finest moment in road racing when he became the first Dutchman to win Paris–Roubaix. The race was run at top speed from the start and favourites Rik Van Looy, Raymond Poulidor and Rudi Altig were caught out by the fast pace and missed the decisive break at Arras. Post’s team mate, Willy Bocklant, was in the break and sacrificed his chances by keeping the pace high for his leader. Five riders entered the velodrome at Roubaix with Post winning the sprint by beating the world champion Benoni Beheyt in the finishing straight. The high pace ensured that Post was also awarded the Ruban Jaune for the highest speed in a classic, the 265 km run at 45.131 km/h. This 1964 record still stands as the fastest Paris–Roubaix although the route has been altered since then.

Post was delighted with his victory, but always the businessman, his delight was increased when he realised his appearance money at the winter six-day races would be increased. In 1965 Post made his only appearance in the Tour de France but he abandoned before Paris. (He subsequently acknowledged that he had doped at the Tour de France.) His only other noteworthy result on the road came in 1967 when he finished runner-up to Eddy Merckx in La Flèche Wallonne although he had wins in smaller races. Post was voted Dutch Sportsman of the year in 1964 and Dutch cyclist of the year in 1963 and 1970.

Track career 
Post rode his first six-day in 1956 and his first victory came in 1957 in Chicago, partnered by Harm Smits. Post had three partners with whom he had most success. In 1960 he teamed with Rik Van Looy and won ten sixes. In 1963 he formed his most successful partnership with the Swiss Fritz Pfenninger and they had 19 victories until 1967, when Post joined the Belgian Patrick Sercu, with whom he had 14 victories up to 1971 and his final and 65th six-day in Frankfurt. Post's 65 six-day wins stood as a record for a few years, beating Rik Van Steenbergen's 40 wins when at the Milan six in 1968 when partnered by Gianni Motta. However, since then René Pijnen (72 wins), Danny Clark (74 wins) and Patrick Sercu (88 wins) have all passed Post's total with Sercu as the new record holder.

Post won the Dutch individual pursuit championships six times between 1957 and 1963. He took 14 European track titles (mostly madison and derny races). In 1965 in Antwerp he set the derny-paced hour record of 63.783 km, beating Stan Ockers' record which had stood for nine years.

After retirement 

Post retired from riding in 1972 and became directeur sportif of the TI–Raleigh team in 1974. He was a former rider who knew the inside of cycling but also a shrewd businessman who could negotiate with sponsors. Post had a reputation of being hard on riders but his success with TI–Raleigh was exceptional. Post had riders such as Hennie Kuiper, Gerrie Knetemann, Jan Raas and Joop Zoetemelk (all Dutch), one of the best squads in the world for a decade. Most impressive was the 1980 edition of the Tour de France. The TI–Raleigh team won 11 stages and Joop Zoetemelk won overall.

The success continued, this time with mainly non-Dutch riders such as Phil Anderson, Eric Vanderaerden, Viatcheslav Ekimov, Olaf Ludwig and Maurizio Fondriest. After the withdrawal of Panasonic, Post led the Histor and then Novemail teams before leaving cycling in 1995. As of September 2020, he is ranked as the seventh most successful director of all time by Cycling Ranking. Post returned to cycling as an adviser to the Rabobank team in 2005. He died on 14 January 2011.

Six-day wins

See also
List of doping cases in cycling

References

Bibliography 
Cycling Heroes, Les Woodland, Springfield Books, 
A Century of Paris–Roubaix, Pascal Sergent, Bromley Books,

External links 

1933 births
2011 deaths
Dutch male cyclists
Directeur sportifs
Dutch track cyclists
Cyclists from Amsterdam
Dutch sportspeople in doping cases
Doping cases in cycling
UCI Road World Championships cyclists for the Netherlands